Saru (stylized as SARU,  "Monkey") is a Japanese manga written and illustrated by Daisuke Igarashi. It was created by a project with novelist author Kōtarō Isaka, in which they together shared ideas to create independents novel and manga works. Saru was launched by Shogakukan in two volumes in February and October 2010.

Publication
Saru is written and illustrated by Daisuke Igarashi. It was created by a project with novelist author Kōtarō Isaka, in which they together shared ideas to create independent novel and manga works. Isaka wrote the novel , released by Chuokoron-Shinsha on November 25, 2009, and Igarashi published an introductory chapter of Saru on the same day on Monthly Ikkis website Ikki Paradise. The two volumes of Saru were published by Shogakukan under the "Ikki Comix" imprint on February 25 and October 29, 2010. 

The manga has been licensed in France by Éditions Sarbacane, and in Italy by J-Pop.

Volume list

Reception
Saru was nominated for the 4th Manga Taishō in 2011.

References

External links
 

Seinen manga
Shogakukan manga